The 2003 Porsche Tennis Grand Prix was a women's tennis tournament played on indoor hard courts at the Filderstadt Tennis Club in Filderstadt, Germany that was part of Tier II of the 2003 WTA Tour. It was the 26th edition of the tournament and was held from 6 October until 13 October 2003. Third-seeded Kim Clijsters won the singles title and earned $98,500 first-prize money.

Finals

Singles

 Kim Clijsters defeated  Justine Henin-Hardenne 5–7, 6–4, 6–2
 It was Clijsters's 7th singles title of the year and the 17th of her career.

Doubles

 Lisa Raymond /  Rennae Stubbs defeated  Cara Black /  Martina Navratilova 6–2, 6–4

Prize money

References

External links
 ITF tournament edition details
 Tournament draws

Porsche Tennis Grand Prix
Porsche Tennis Grand Prix
2003 in German tennis
2000s in Baden-Württemberg
Porsch